Johannes Hansen (14 November 1886 – 25 May 1946) was a Danish footballer. He played in three matches for the Denmark national football team from 1913 to 1917.

References

External links
 

1886 births
1946 deaths
Danish men's footballers
Denmark international footballers
Place of birth missing
Association footballers not categorized by position